Pilar Angela D. Paraiso, or better known as Bubbles Paraiso (born July 24, 1984 in the Makati, Philippines), is a Filipino actress and the younger sister of actor Paolo Paraiso. She is currently seen on Kapamilya Channel.

Filmography

Television

Film

References

External links

Living people
Filipino film actresses
1984 births
Viva Artists Agency
GMA Network personalities
ABS-CBN personalities